Mario Urrutia, Jr. (born January 18, 1986) is a former American football wide receiver. Urrutia is also a co-owner of the Kentucky Xtreme. He was drafted by the Cincinnati Bengals in the seventh round of the 2008 NFL Draft. He played college football at Louisville.

Urrutia was also a member of the New York Jets, Tampa Bay Buccaneers, Hartford Colonials, Sacramento Mountain Lions, Utah Blaze, New Orleans VooDoo, Kentucky Xtreme and Winnipeg Blue Bombers.

Early life
Born the son of Ruth Annette and Mario Urrutia, Sr., Urrutia attended Fern Creek High School in Louisville, Kentucky, where he was a member of the Tigers football team.

Urrutia committed to the University of Louisville on January 18, 2004. He chose Louisville over football scholarships from Indiana, Kentucky, Nebraska, Virginia and West Virginia.

College career
In Urrutia's freshman year, he was named second-team All Big East Conference. Catching 37 passes for 797 yards, he ranked third on the team in both statistics. He was also named a Sporting News All-American.

While the squad went 12-1, including a win over ACC champion Wake Forest in the 2007 Orange Bowl, Urrutia had his best statistical season during this year, catching a career-high 58 balls for 973 yards. He also had 6 touchdown catches. He was second on the team in catches.

Urrutia did not repeat the success of his 2006 season in 2007. He played in only 8 games, catching 35 passes for 501 yards and 3 touchdowns. He left Louisville on December 14, 2007.

Professional career

Utah Blaze
In 2013, Urrutia was assigned by the Utah Blaze of the Arena Football League as a wide receiver. Urrutia had a big season for the Blaze, hauling in 142 passes for 1,675 yards and scoring 39 touchdowns. Urruita's big season landed him the Arena Football League Rookie of the Year Award.

New Orleans VooDoo
On September 6, 2013, Urrutia was selected by the New Orleans VooDoo during the dispersal draft.

Kentucky Xtreme
In November 2013, Urrutia announced that he would be joining the Kentucky Xtreme front office as a co-owner. Urrutia also played for the Xtreme.

Winnipeg Blue Bombers
Urruita left the Xtreme to sign with the Canadian Football League's (CFL) Winnipeg Blue Bombers.

References

External links
Louisville Cardinals bio
Tampa Bay Buccaneers bio

1986 births
Living people
Players of American football from Louisville, Kentucky
Players of Canadian football from Louisville, Kentucky
American football wide receivers
Canadian football wide receivers
American players of Canadian football
Louisville Cardinals football players
Cincinnati Bengals players
New York Jets players
Tampa Bay Buccaneers players
Hartford Colonials players
Utah Blaze players
New Orleans VooDoo players
Winnipeg Blue Bombers players
Fern Creek High School alumni